Bring It Home to Me is an album by American trumpeter Blue Mitchell recorded in 1966 and released on the Blue Note label. The albums features mainly blues. An exception is "Portrait of Jennie" (incorrectly titled "Portrait of Jenny" on the album), a ballad originally written for the movie Portrait of Jennie (1948).

Reception

The Allmusic review awarded the album 4 stars.

Track listing
All compositions by Blue Mitchell except where noted
 "Bring It Home to Me" (Jimmy Heath) - 7:58
 "Blues 3 for 1" - 6:04
 "Port Rico Rock" (Tom McIntosh) - 6:34
 "Gingerbread Boy" (Heath) - 6:36
 "Portrait of Jenny" (Gordon Burdge, J. Russell Robinson) - 5:39
 "Blue's Theme" - 5:23

Personnel
Blue Mitchell - trumpet
Junior Cook - tenor saxophone
Harold Mabern - piano
Gene Taylor - bass
Billy Higgins - drums

References

Blue Note Records albums
Blue Mitchell albums
1967 albums
Albums recorded at Van Gelder Studio
Albums produced by Alfred Lion